The year 2004 is the 12th year in the history of the Ultimate Fighting Championship (UFC), a mixed martial arts promotion based in the United States. In 2004 the UFC held 5 events beginning with, UFC 46: Supernatural.

Title fights

Debut UFC fighters

The following fighters fought their first UFC fight in 2004:

 David Terrell
 Georges St-Pierre
 Ivan Menjivar
 Jay Hieron
 Jeff Curran
 Joe Doerksen

 Joe Riggs
 Jonathan Wiezorek
 Justin Eilers
 Lee Murray
 Mike Brown
 Mike Kyle

 Patrick Cote
 Renato Verissimo
 Ronald Jhun
 Travis Lutter
 Trevor Prangley
 Wade Shipp

Events list

See also
 UFC
 List of UFC champions
 List of UFC events

References

Ultimate Fighting Championship by year
2004 in mixed martial arts